"Amazing Grace (Used to Be Her Favorite Song)" is a song written by Russell Smith, first recorded in Montreal in 1974 by Jesse Winchester and his band the Rhythm Aces, assisted by Smith. During the winter of 1976, it became a hit by the Amazing Rhythm Aces on their 1975 album Stacked Deck. It was the band's follow-up single to their debut hit "Third Rate Romance."

The song reached #9 on the U.S. country singles chart and #72 on the Billboard Hot 100. It charted very similarly in Canada.

Content
The song is a cautionary tale against the dangers of alcoholism.  It also teaches a second moral lesson, prompting the listener to consider the effects of negative personal influences in the lives of others, especially within the context of  close relationships.

In the song, a husband accepts the blame for introducing his wife to a lifestyle of alcohol and partying through her desire to change him by doing what pleased him. He describes her previously as a "good girl" and an "angel," with "Amazing Grace" as her favorite song.  But after suffering neglect from his devotion to many late nights out drinking, over time she herself falls harder to the power of his bad habits and ultimately leaves him.

Chart performance

References

External links
 Lyrics of this song
 

1974 songs
The Amazing Rhythm Aces songs
1975 singles
Songs written by Russell Smith (singer)
ABC Records singles